Stigmella lemniscella is a moth of the family Nepticulidae. It is found in most of Europe.

The wingspan is .The head in male black, in female orange, collar blackish. Antennal eyecaps whitish. Forewings shining brownish-golden ; a somewhat oblique shining silvery fascia beyond middle, preceded by a brownish-purple suffusion, apical area beyond this dark purple-fuscous. Hindwings dark fuscous. Adults are on wing from May to August. There are two generations per year.

The larvae feed on Ulmus glabra, Ulmus laevis, Ulmus minor and Ulmus pumila. They mine the leaves of their host plant. The mine consists of a slender corridor, hardly widened in the end. The corridor often follows the leaf margin for some time. Pupation takes place outside of the mine.

References

External links
bladmineerders.nl
UKmoths
Swedish moths
Fauna Europaea
Stigmella lemniscella images at  Consortium for the Barcode of Life
lepiforum.de

Nepticulidae
Moths of Europe
Taxa named by Philipp Christoph Zeller
Moths described in 1839